Thomas Alexander Crerar,  (June 17, 1876 – April 11, 1975) was a western Canadian politician and a leader of the short-lived Progressive Party of Canada.  He was born in Molesworth, Ontario, and moved to Manitoba at a young age.

Early career
Crerar rose to prominence as leader of the Manitoba Grain Growers' Association in the 1910s.  Although he had no experience as an elected official, he was appointed as Minister of Agriculture in Robert Laird Borden's Union government on October 12, 1917, to provide a show of national unity during the First World War.  He was easily elected to the House of Commons of Canada for Marquette in the election of 1917.

On June 6, 1919, Crerar resigned from his position in protest against the high tariff policies of the Conservative-dominated government.  He was strongly in favor of free trade with the United States, which would have benefited the western farmers.

Progressive Party of Canada
In 1920, he was selected as leader of the Progressive Party. In the 1921 election, he led the party to a landslide victory in western Canada, giving them 65 seats in the House of Commons. Crerar failed to hold the party together, however.  He resigned as leader in 1922, and the party collapsed shortly thereafter.

Private sector work
Crerar spent some time in the private sector before returning to politics in 1929, as a member of William Lyon Mackenzie King's Liberal Party.  Although once again not holding a seat in parliament, he was appointed Minister of Railways and Canals (Canada) on December 30, 1929, and won a by-election in Brandon on February 5, 1930.  King's government was defeated in the general election that followed, however, and Crerar was personally defeated in his riding.

Return to politics

He returned to parliament in the 1935 election, as the member for the northern Manitoba riding of Churchill.  He was once again appointed to King's cabinet, serving as Minister of Immigration and Colonization, Minister of Mines, Minister of the Interior and Superintendent-General of Indian Affairs from October 23, 1935, to November 30, 1936.  On December 1, 1936, he was removed from most of his responsibilities and became simply Minister of Mines and Resources, holding the position until April 17, 1945.

Crerar was appointed to the Senate of Canada on April 18, 1945, and remained a Senator until his retirement on May 31, 1966. In 1973, he was made a Companion of the Order of Canada. He died in 1975.

Electoral history

External links
 
 

1876 births
1975 deaths
Canadian senators from Manitoba
Companions of the Order of Canada
Liberal Party of Canada MPs
Liberal Party of Canada senators
Liberal-Unionist MPs in Canada
Canadian Ministers of Railways and Canals
Members of the House of Commons of Canada from Manitoba
Members of the King's Privy Council for Canada
Progressive Party of Canada MPs
Persons of National Historic Significance (Canada)
Interior ministers of Canada
Canadian people of World War II